Thomas Colby (c. 1530 – 5 March 1588) was an English politician from Sherfield-on-Loddon, Hampshire. He was said to be a puritan west-country lawyer ‘of great living’.

He was a Member (MP) of the Parliament of England for Melcombe Regis in 1563 and for St. Ives in 1586.

He married Elizabeth, daughter and heir of Edward Gilbert, alderman of London.  He died on 5 Mar 1588.  After Thomas's death Elizabeth married Michael Molyns (d. 1615) Member (MP) for Wallingford.

References

1530 births
1588 deaths
Members of the Parliament of England for St Ives
English MPs 1563–1567
English MPs 1586–1587
Members of the Parliament of England (pre-1707) for Melcombe Regis
People from Sherfield on Loddon